Shahid Saduqi may refer to:
 Shahid Saduqi, Ilam
 Shahid Saduqi, Kermanshah